Sergey Rubtsov (born 4 September 1965 in Russian SFSR) is a retired Kazakhstani athlete specializing in the shot put. He twice represented his country at the Olympic Games, in 1996 and 2000 without reaching the final round. He was born in the Russian SSR of the Soviet Union.

His personal bests are 20.49 metres outdoors and 20.47 metres indoors, both from 1992 and standing national records.

Competition record

References

External links
 

1965 births
Living people
Russian male shot putters
Kazakhstani male shot putters
Olympic athletes of Kazakhstan
Athletes (track and field) at the 1996 Summer Olympics
Athletes (track and field) at the 2000 Summer Olympics
World Athletics Championships athletes for Kazakhstan
Asian Games medalists in athletics (track and field)
Athletes (track and field) at the 1994 Asian Games
Athletes (track and field) at the 1998 Asian Games
Asian Games silver medalists for Kazakhstan
Asian Games bronze medalists for Kazakhstan
Medalists at the 1994 Asian Games
Medalists at the 1998 Asian Games
Kazakhstani people of Russian descent